The 1975 Brisbane Rugby League season was the 67th season of Brisbane Rugby League premiership. Eight rugby league teams from across Brisbane competed for the premiership, which culminated in a grand final match between the Western Suburbs and Redcliffe clubs.

Season summary 
Teams played each other three times, with 21 rounds of competition played. It resulted in a top five of Western Suburbs, Northern Suburbs, Redcliffe, Eastern Suburbs and Wynnum-Manly.

The 1975 season's Rothmans Medallist was Northern Suburbs player Steve Calder.

With seconds remaining in the decider, Redcliffe were trailing 26–24 to minor premiers Western Suburbs. The Dolphins had the ball and launched a bomb hoping for the best. However, before the ball landed, fans had flooded Lang Park ensuring there was no chance for Redcliffe to pressure Wests' receiver into an error. The ball ended up going into touch, ensuring that the fans did not ruin the final play of the game.

Teams

Ladder

Finals

Grand Final 

Redcliffe's storming finish was not enough, as Western Suburbs held on to claim its first premiership in 21 years.

Redcliffe were coming home strong 26–24, but Panthers held on, to win their ninth premiership and first since 1954. Redcliffe won the scrum count 7–4, the Dolphins winning the penalties 11-7 as well.

Western Suburbs 26 (Tries: H. Cameron, R. Bradshaw, G. McCarthy, G. Heading. Goals: W. Stewart)

Redcliffe 24 (Tries: T. Obst, I. Pearce, G. Russell, B. Bleakley. Goals: I. Pearce 6)

References

Rugby league in Brisbane
Brisbane Rugby League season